Colonel Kim Nichole Reed-Campbell (born June 6, 1975) is a retired United States Air Force officer and Command Pilot. She was decorated for piloting her A-10 Thunderbolt II back to base in southern Iraq after taking heavy anti-aircraft artillery (AAA) damage in aerial combat over Baghdad during Operation Iraqi Freedom in 2003. After her tour of duty in Iraq ended, Campbell gave lectures throughout the United States about her experience, including one at the National Air and Space Museum. Campbell was promoted to the rank of major in 2006.

Colonel Campbell was Commander, 612th Theater Operations Group, Davis–Monthan Air Force Base, from July 2016 to June 2018. Her final assignment was at the United States Air Force Academy as Faculty Chair, Airpower Innovation & Integration, Department of Military and Strategic Studies.

She is married to another A-10 pilot, Colonel Scott Campbell, whom she met at the Air Force Academy.

Early life and education
Campbell is the daughter of the former mayor of San Jose (and former USAF captain) Chuck Reed. She joined the Civil Air Patrol as a cadet at age 13 and made her first solo flight in a civilian aircraft over San Jose at age 17.

Campbell graduated with a Bachelor of Science degree from the United States Air Force Academy in 1997, where she was the cadet wing commander (the highest position a USAFA cadet can achieve) as was her father during his time as a cadet at the Air Force Academy, the first time that a father and daughter both served as cadet wing commander. She holds a degree in International Security Studies from the University of Reading, and a Master of Business Administration from Imperial College London, which she undertook while on a Marshall Scholarship.

April 2003 incident
During a mission over Baghdad on April 7, 2003, Campbell's aircraft (A-10A s/n 81-0987) suffered damage. "We did our job with the guys there on the ground, and as we were on our way out is when I felt the jet get hit. It was pretty obvious — it was loud...  I lost all hydraulics instantaneously, and the jet rolled left and pointed toward the ground, which was an uncomfortable feeling over Baghdad. It didn't respond to any of my control inputs." She tried several procedures to get the aircraft under control, none of which worked; last, she put the plane into manual reversion, meaning she was flying the aircraft without hydraulics. The aircraft immediately responded. "The jet started climbing away from the ground, which was a good feeling because there was no way I wanted to eject over Baghdad."  With some technical advice from her flight leader, Lieutenant Colonel Turner, she flew the crippled plane for an hour back to the air base. "The jet was performing exceptionally well. I had no doubt in my mind I was going to land that airplane." Landing was tricky: "When you lose all the hydraulics, you don't have speed brakes, you don't have brakes, and you don't have steering."

For this action in aerial combat, Campbell was awarded the Distinguished Flying Cross.

On the ground it was discovered that her A-10 had sustained damage to one engine and to the redundant hydraulic systems, disabling the flight controls, landing gear and brakes, and horizontal stabilizer. A detailed inspection revealed hundreds of holes in the airframe and that large sections of the stabilizer and hydraulic controls were missing.

"She's one of the few pilots who ever landed the A-10 in the manual mode," said General Richard Myers, USAF, Chairman of the Joint Chiefs of Staff.

References

1975 births
Living people
People from San Jose, California
United States Air Force personnel of the Iraq War
Recipients of the Distinguished Flying Cross (United States)
United States Air Force Academy alumni
United States Air Force officers
Women in the United States Air Force
Women in the Iraq War
Recipients of the Air Medal
American women aviators
Aviators from California
21st-century American women

External links
Interview to Cnl Kim "KC" Campbell